Creston or Kreston (or Crestone or Krestone (Κρηστώνη), was a town of Crestonia in ancient Macedonia. The town is mentioned by Herodotus as being inhabited by Pelasgians who spoke a non-Greek language. The name is also preserved as Crestona or Krestona (Κρηστώνα).

Its site is unlocated.

References

Populated places in ancient Macedonia
Former populated places in Greece
Lost ancient cities and towns